The Western Design Center (WDC), located in Mesa, Arizona, is a company which develops intellectual property for, and licenses manufacture of, MOS Technology 65xx based microprocessors, microcontrollers (µCs), and related support devices. WDC was founded in 1978 by a former MOS Technology employee and coholder of the MOS Technology 6502 patent, Bill Mensch.

Beyond discrete devices, WDC offers device designs in the form of semiconductor intellectual property cores (IP cores) to use inside other chips such as application-specific integrated circuit (ASICs), and provides ASIC and embedded systems consulting services revolving around their processor designs. WDC also produces C compilers, assembler/linker packages, simulators, development–evaluation printed circuit boards, and in-circuit emulators for their processors.

Hardware products

Devices

Personal computer
The Mensch Computer is a W65C265 and W65C22-based hobbyist experimental personal computer named after company founder Bill Mensch.

External links

Electronics companies of the United States
Companies based in Mesa, Arizona
Computer companies established in 1978
Electronics companies established in 1978
1978 establishments in Arizona